The Petroleum Act 1879 (42 & 43 Vict c 47) is an Act of the Parliament of the United Kingdom which continued and amended the Petroleum Act 1871.

Background 
The storage and transport  of petroleum and petroleum products had been controlled by the Petroleum Acts 1862 to 1871. By 1879 the provisions of the 1871 Act needed to be updated.

The Petroleum Act 1871 was time-limited, it expired on 1 October 1872 (1871 Act Section 18). The 1871 Act was continued by annual statutes until 1879. Section 4 of the Petroleum Act 1879 enacted that the 1871 Act shall continue in force until otherwise directed by Parliament.

The Petroleum Act 1871 had defined petroleum as a substance that gives off an inflammable vapour at less than 100 °F (37.8 °C). It was expedient to apply a more stringent standard and to redefine petroleum as that which gives off an inflammable vapour at less than 73 °F (22.8 °C). The test equipment and test methods required to determine the flammable vapour temperature were modified as defined in schedule 1 of the 1879 Act. The Act mandated use of the Abel test developed by the chemist Frederick Abel at the government's request.

Petroleum Act 1879 
The Petroleum Act 1879 (42 & 43 Vict. c. 47) received royal assent on 11 August 1879. Its long title is ‘An Act to continue and amend the Petroleum Act 1871’.

Provisions 
The Act comprises six sections and two schedules:

 Section 1. Short title and construction
 Section 2. Alteration of test
 Section 3. Verification of test apparatus
 Section 4. Continuance of the Petroleum Act 1871
 Section 5. Commencement (31 December 1879)
 Section 6. Repeal of Part of the Petroleum Act 1871
 Schedule 1. Mode of testing petroleum so as to ascertain the temperature at which it will give off inflammable vapour
 Schedule 2. Act repealed: 1871 Act from Section 3 to the end of section 18.

Aftermath 
The Conservators of the River Thames made bye-laws under the 1879 Act prohibiting any ship carrying petroleum from approaching London west of Thames Haven.

The 1879 Act remained in force until repealed (in the UK) by the Petroleum (Consolidation) Act 1928.

The Petroleum Act 1879 applied to Ireland and remained a statute of the Republic of Ireland until 1972 when it was repealed by the Dangerous Substances Act 1972.

See also 

 Petroleum Act

References 

History of the petroleum industry in the United Kingdom
United Kingdom Acts of Parliament 1879